Trygve Magnus Slagsvold Vedum (born 1 December 1978) is a Norwegian politician who has served as Minister of Finance since 2021. A member of the Centre Party, which he has led since 2014, he has been a Member of Parliament (MP) for Hedmark since 2005. Vedum also served as Minister of Agriculture and Food from 2012 to 2013.

Early life
Vedum was born in Hamar as a son of Trond Vidar Vedum, a lecturer in biology at Hedmark University College, and teacher Karen Sigrid Slagsvold. After finishing the lower secondary school in Romedal in 1994 he entered the three-year upper secondary education in natural resources management, with two years at Jønsberg and one year at Tomb. Following graduation, he studied sciences at Hedmark University College, before enrolling at the University of Oslo in 1999 where he received a bachelor's degree in political science in 2002.

Political career

Early career
He chaired the Centre Youth from 2002 to 2004, at the time also serving as central board member of the Centre Party. He was elected to Hedmark county council in 1999, serving until 2005. From 2004 to 2005 he also worked as an organizational adviser in the Centre Party.

Parliament
He was elected to the Parliament of Norway from Hedmark in 2005 and re-elected in 2009 and 2013. Vedum started out in the Standing Committee on Local Government and Public Administration, then changed to the Standing Committee on Health and Care Services in 2008. In October 2008 he became deputy leader here, and also Second Deputy President of the Odelsting as well as party whip. He was also a member of the Electoral Committee from 2005 to 2012, and from 2009 to 2012 the Standing Committee on Foreign Affairs and Defence and the Enlarged Committee on Foreign Affairs and Defence.

Minister of Agriculture and Food
On 18 June 2012, Vedum was appointed to the Stoltenberg's Second Cabinet to serve as Minister of Agriculture and Food. He lost his job after the cabinet fell following the 2013 election. He returned to Parliament, where he took a seat in the Standing Committee on Finance and Economic Affairs.

Party leader
In 2009, he became second deputy leader of the Centre Party, then party leader in 2014. At the time, he was the youngest ever Centre Party leader.

Vedum led the party into the 2017 election, with the party becoming a clear winner of the election with 10,3 percent of the vote. The party received their best results since the 1993 election. Despite this, there was no change of government. Vedum himself said one had to look back to the 1990s during the EU debate and the glory days of Per Borten's premiership to find equally good results.

After a lot of speculation, the party convention announced in June 2021 that Vedum would be the party's prime minister candidate for the 2021 election.
His party gained 9 seats in Parliament and receiving 13,5 percent of the vote following the election on 13 September. His party had campaigned to end Erna Solberg's centralisation policies, and to form a Labour-Centre Party government, the latter to contrary wishes from Labour leader Jonas Gahr Støre.

Vedum subsequently opened to work with the Socialist Left Party in government, and along with the Labour Party, started pre-negotiations on 23 September. On 29 September, the Socialist Left Party withdrew from negotiations, notably citing lack of progress when it came to petroleum and welfare, among other policies as well. Vedum reassured that his party would still work with the Socialist Left if it would be relevant, and called for immediate negotiations to begin between the Centre Party and Labour Party. These negotiations began later that day. On 8 October, Støre and Vedum announced that the new government's platform would be presented on 13 October and that they were ready to form a government on 14 October.

Vedum was mentioned as a candidate for minister of local government, but was then mentioned as a candidate for minister of finance after Støre rejected to appoint Sigbjørn Gjelsvik to the position. This was due to the Labour Party preferring a Centre Party member from their leadership to hold the position, a position Gjelsvik did not hold.

Minister of Finance
Vedum was eventually appointed minister of finance in Støre's Cabinet on 14 October 2021.

Over the ensuing electricity price crisis, Vedum stated that he hoped to do something about as soon as possible, saying: "If we reduce the taxes on electricity, and there is something we can approve in the Storting".

Vedum further announced he would freeze executive salaries in the state to avoid a paycheck in state-owned companies, saying that the government would "put on the breaks with full force". He further said: "We will contribute to reduced wages, even if they will still earn well. But they should not exceed what is the average wage increase in the state. Therefore, the government must be active when it comes to executive salaries".

Vedum expressed that there was no "miracle cure" for the electricity price crisis, and said that he couldn't promise measures that rapid cuts in people's electricity bills.

Vedum announced clear measures on taxes and fees to start already in 2022, despite a short deadline with the budget to be presented on 8 November. Of the measures, he said: "We will have a completely different distribution profile.  If you earn less than NOK 750,000, you will find that the tax measures and the measures we take will make everyday life easier".

A week before the revised budget being presented, Vedum announced that 1,2 billion NOK would be spent on closure threatened primary schools for every year starting in 2022. He did however warn that if a municipality decides to close a school, they would lose their grant for said school.

On 8 November, Vedum presented the Støre government's revised state budget.

On 1 December, Vedum said he was willing to take the bill to dissolve Viken. He further said that the counties that make up Viken, Akershus, Østfold and Buskerud; didn't need to worry about the costs. Vedum went on to say that the government supports Viken's dissolution economically as well.

On 7 December, with new COVID-19 measures being presented, Vedum announced that the compensation scheme would be reintroduced. This was to help companies who would be effected by the new measures, and that the state would pay for COVID-19 related sick leave from the sixth day. Vedum further said: "The paradox is that the Norwegian economy is otherwise doing very well".

On 11 December, Vedum, alongside prime minister Jonas Gahr Støre and minister of petroleum and energy Marte Mjøs Persen, presented a security scheme to battle the rising electricity prices. Vedum stated: "this scene is more bulletproof", and said that the government didn't know how expensive the scheme would be, but had an estimation of ca. 5 billion NOK. Vedum also stated that if the electricity prices became more expensive, so would the scheme. However, this resulted in a large amount of criticism, as the bill wouldn't be applicable for individuals living in collectives, which is about 20% of the total population. Several have also pointed out that the bill would only make a small dent in the sky-rocketing bills, which had risen 5-10 times to their average prices then previous years by December.

In early January 2022, Vedum reiterated that the state would pay for the dissolution of forced merged counties, this time regarding Troms og Finnmark. He also expressed that it would be more costly and bad to continue with the merged counties. The Conservative Party's spokesperson for financial policy, Mudassar Kapur, criticised the spending, saying that there were more important things to spend money on, such as the ongoing COVID-19 pandemic, electricity prices etc.

Vedum and Støre announced on 8 January that the electricity support would be increased from 55 to 80% until March. Vedum expressed that it was important that the scheme would effect "all wallets", saying: "When the market does not do the job, we must ensure social justice. The Conservatives criticized us before Christmas because we made a scheme that effected everyone. They thought it should only effect those who need it the most. We have schemes such as housing support and strengthened social assistance. But we are concerned that it should also effect the carpenter, the teacher and the nurse. The high prices are something that affects everyone, then we must also stand up for everyone". He further said that the government would put forward a proposition to the Storting regarding the adjustments.

Vedum put forward a new crisis package with further measures against COVID-19 to the Storting on 14 January. The package is worth 20,2 billion NOK and notably covers business, culture and volunteering, public transport, aviation and health and care. The package did however receive skepticism from the government's preferred working partner, the Socialist Left Party. They expressed that businesses that really didn't need compensation had gotten it unnecessarily, and in addition demanding that the package’s climate profile be sharpened.

On 4 February, Vedum announced the nomination of Jens Stoltenberg to become the next governor of Norges Bank. Of the nomination, he said: "I am pleased that today I can present Jens Stoltenberg as Norway's new central bank governor. The easiest thing for me would probably have been to choose someone else, but I have been concerned with one thing: Choosing the one that is best qualified overall".

At a press conference on 27 February, Vedum announced that the government would be initiating sanctions against the Russian economy and political leadership. He also stated the government's goal is to pull the Norwegian Oil Fund completely out of the Russian market. He stated: "Norway wants to withdraw and does not want to be part of the market in Russia, and we will sell out over time. This is an assessment we have made precisely because we want to give clear feedback that a type of abuse we have now seen is not acceptable".

With rising fuel prices following the war in Ukraine, Vedum faced pressure from the Norwegian Automobile Federation, Norwegian Truck Federation and several of his own MPs to reduce fuel taxes. Vedum told TV2 that the fuel prices would be a topic at the government's budget conference, but also rejected the possibility of a compensation scheme for the rising fuel prices. He stated: "We will look at measures that make the overall tax and duty level for those who earn less than 750,000 kroner go down and not up".

On 24 March, Vedum announced the nomination of Ida Wolden Bache to become governor of Norges Bank, after Jens Stoltenberg resigned as incoming governor in order to continue as NATO Secretary-General for another year. At the same time, he expressed understanding for his decision and praised Wolden Bache, stating that "we will get a good governor for Norges Bank in Wolden Bache". Norges Bank stated that Vedum would put forward the nomination for a six year term, to be accepted at the State Council as soon as possible.

In early May, Vedum sparked controversy when he claimed that Norwegian families' economy generally was going up and could afford more. His claim was criticised by the opposition and economic experts and professors. Progress Party leader Sylvi Listhaug remarked that Norwegian families could generally afford less. Vedum remained firm of the calculation and denied that he or the Ministry of Finance had tried to "add make-up" to it.

On 4 June, Vedum announced that he would tighten the tax rules regarding the use of private airplanes and properties. The burden of proof from the Tax Administration to the company in question and the owner; which would mean that one would need to show that i.e a private plane would be used for coming business and not for private use. Vedum said: "Yes, you can still have a helicopter, but you can not spend it on the company if you only use it privately. Then you have to pay for it yourself. If you want it, go right ahead".

In August, Vedum stated that less petroleum money should be used in 2023. This came after SSB announced new numbers that showed that the prices had risen with 6,8% when it came to travelling, fuel, alcohol free beverages and food products. In response, he stated: "My main job is to create security. The war in Ukraine has caused unrest related to defence, preparedness and migrations of refugees. We have therefore made heavy priorities this year to secure this and strengthen our national preparedness and control. The second consequence is a great turmoil in prices.  It creates insecurity. We have been able to solve previous crises by allocating more money". He also indicated that the government is currently working on the 2023 budget and that a security arrangement for electricity had made inflation smaller in Norway then in Denmark.

On 27 August, Vedum announced that an electricity safety scheme would continue to be in place beyond March 2023, and that it would be the government's recommendation to the Storting. He stated: "When we adopted the safety scheme last autumn, the analyzes indicated that prices could normalize this summer. There is nothing to indicate that this will happen. Therefore, people can feel secure that we will have an safety scheme as long as we have these extraordinary times that we now have".

On 21 September, Vedum welcomed debate about the interest rate jumps, but declined the Norwegian Confederation of Trade Unions's economic chief, Roger Bjørnstad's demand to talk to the Governor of the Central Bank about the issue. He stated: "I strongly disagree with Bjørnstad that I should whisper anything in the central bank governor's ear. We must have order and clear rules of the game. We have to look at the long lines: such an informal management dialogue would not create stability.  There must be a wall between Norges Bank and us as politicians in day-to-day management".

At an unexpected press conference held on 28 September, Vedum and prime minister Jonas Gahr Støre announced that the government would be taking in 33 billion NOK from the power producers and aquaculture industries. Vedum stated: "There is an enormous need to cover the state budget. Usually a government has 10-20 billion extra, but now we have the opposite. We could cut it, but we think it's wrong. Such extensive cuts would be completely wrong in the times we live in now. We could raise taxes for everyone. Then it would have been NOK 7,000 extra per Norwegian over the age of 16, and it would have been completely the wrong medicine". The aquaculture industry went out against the possibility of a basic interest tax for aquaculture and expressed that it would "shut off the lights along the coast".

On 6 October, Vedum presented the government's state budget for 2023.

Vedum met his European counterparts from the EU and EFTA countries in Brussels on 8 November. He also met with European Commissioner for Financial Stability Mairead McGuinness and European Commissioner for Economy Paolo Gentiloni, where he demanded changes in the EU rules for state aid and the practice of differentiated employer's contribution. He reasoned that the rules specifically effected companies in Northern Norway.

On 7 December, Vedum stated that he was open to changing the previously mentioned basic interest tax on salmon, which would in return not require fishing companies to put their prices up for the stock exchange.

In January 2023, Vedum visited Brussels to convince EFTA to accept Norway's interpretation of state aid rules for so-called companies in difficulty, which they later accepted. Vedum called the decision "an important breakthrough". He also said that he would inform the Norwegian Tax Administration about the decision and instruct them to go through tax cases again with the new interpretation as basis.

In February, prime minister Jonas Gahr Støre, accompanied by Vedum and energy minister Terje Aasland, announced that the electricity support scheme would be expanded until 2024. Vedum stated that the government's goal was to stabilise electricity prices. He also stated that the government would put down a commission to look into how the electricity market will handle it, with their findings to be delivered on 15 October.

Other
Vedum has also been a deputy board member of Folk og Forsvar (1999–2000) and a board member of Nei til atomvåpen (2005–2007), Nei til EU (2005–2007), Norway's Contact Committee for Immigrants and the Authorities (2006–) and Menighetssøsterhjemmet (2007–2009).

Vedum participated in the first season of the Norwegian equivalent of The Masked Singer, Maskorama, disguised as The Scarecrow.

He made a guest appearance in the final of Farmen 2022.

Personal life
He is the son of teacher and children's book author Trond Vidar Vedum (1946–) and teacher Karen Sigrid Slagsvold (1949–). He is married to Cathrine Wergeland and has two children. He also likes dancing.

Health
At the party convention in March 2023, Vedum revealed that he had been diagnosed with multiple sclerosis in 2020, but went through treatment and was stabilised by 2021.

Bibliography
Nær folk (2021; non-fiction), co-authored by Jan Bøhler

References 

|-

|-

1978 births
Living people
People from Stange
Politicians from Hamar
University of Oslo alumni
Hedmark University College alumni
Hedmark politicians
Centre Party (Norway) politicians
Leaders of political parties in Norway
Members of the Storting
Ministers of Agriculture and Food of Norway
Norwegian anti–nuclear weapons activists
21st-century Norwegian politicians
Ministers of Finance of Norway